Mong Tung Wan is a bay and a village on Chi Ma Wan Peninsula, Lantau Island, in Hong Kong.

Administration
Mong Tung Wan is a recognized village under the New Territories Small House Policy.

References

External links

 Delineation of area of existing village Mong Tung Wan (South Lantao) for election of resident representative (2019 to 2022)

Villages in Islands District, Hong Kong
Lantau Island